Attack Squadron 135 or VA-135 was a short-lived Attack Squadron of the U.S. Navy, nicknamed the Thunderbirds. It was established on 21 August 1961 and disestablished a year later, on 1 October 1962. It was based at NAS Jacksonville, and for a short time in 1962 at NAS Cecil Field. The squadron flew the AD-6 Skyraider aircraft. It was the second squadron to be designated as VA-135, the first VA-135 was disestablished on 30 September 1949.

Operational history
August 1961: The squadron was established as part of a new Air Group to increase the strength of the fleet during the Berlin Crisis of 1961.
March–May 1962: The squadron participated in ’s shakedown cruise in the Caribbean.

See also

 List of inactive United States Navy aircraft squadrons
 History of the United States Navy

References

External links

Attack squadrons of the United States Navy
Wikipedia articles incorporating text from the Dictionary of American Naval Aviation Squadrons